Aristotelia devexella is a moth of the family Gelechiidae. It was described by Annette Frances Braun in 1925. It is found in North America, where it has been recorded from Alberta, Arizona and Oklahoma.

References

Moths described in 1925
Aristotelia (moth)
Moths of North America
Taxa named by Annette Frances Braun